Robert George Dunnett Howell (23 January 1877 – 27 September 1942) was an English cricketer. Howell's batting style is unknown. He was born at Edmonton, Middlesex.

While undertaking studies at Emmanuel College, Cambridge, Howell made his first-class debut for Cambridge University against Hampshire at Fenner's in 1898. He made a second first-class appearance for the university in the following season against the Marylebone Cricket Club at Fenner's. In 1900, he made a single first-class appearance for Sussex against Cambridge University at the County Ground, Hove. Howell had little success in his three first-class appearances, scoring a total of 14 runs.

He died at Sydenham, London, on 27 September 1942.

References

External links
Robert Howell at ESPNcricinfo
Robert Howell at CricketArchive

1877 births
1942 deaths
People from Edmonton, London
Alumni of Emmanuel College, Cambridge
English cricketers
Cambridge University cricketers
Sussex cricketers